Lee Charm (born 3 April 1954 as Bernhard Quandt), formerly known as Lee Han-woo, is a South Korean actor and entrepreneur. He was CEO of the Korea Tourism Organization from July 2009 to November 2013.

He stepped down as head of Korea Tourism Organization amidst a massive public criticism that revealed he had sex with a prostitute in Japan while on a business trip.

Publications
 나는 독일제 순 한국인 (1997) 
 툭 터놓고 씹는 이야기 (2000) 
 무한한 가능성을 가진 답답한 나라 한국 (2007)

References

External links
Official blog
https://m.imdb.com/name/nm5276920

1954 births
Living people
South Korean male television actors
Johannes Gutenberg University Mainz alumni
Yi clan of Dogil
Place of birth missing (living people)